Sara Tse (Tse Suk Ting, ; born 1974) is a Hong Kong visual artist. She uses porcelain as her medium of expression. She transforms common objects into porcelain, clay and reconstructs forgotten experiences. She is the chairperson of the Hong Kong Ceramics Association.

Education 
Sare Tse graduated from the Chinese University of Hong Kong with a major in Fine Arts. She received her MFA degree from the Royal Melbourne Institute of Technology, Australia.

Works and exhibitions 
Her works have been shown in many solo and group exhibitions in Hong Kong, Shanghai, Taiwan, New York, Chicago, Tokyo, Madrid, Queensland and Melbourne since 1995. The venues include Queensland Art Gallery, Hong Kong Museum of Art (2003, 2010–2011) and Fukuoka Asian Art Museum (2009).

Awards 
She was the award winner of the Hong Kong Art Biennial Exhibition in 2003 and she also won the Ceramic Award from The Friends of the Pottery Workshop in 1998. She received a number of grants including "Fond Des Artistes" from Alliance Francaise in 2006 and project grants from the Hong Kong Arts Development Council in 2002 and 1999.

References 

1974 births
Hong Kong artists
Hong Kong women artists
Living people